Benedetto Giacinto Sangermano (7 January 1638 – 7 June 1702) was a Roman Catholic prelate who served as Bishop of Nusco (1680–1702).

Biography
Benedetto Giacinto Sangermano was born in Bisignano, Italy on 7 January 1638 and ordained a priest on 1 April 1673.
On 7 October 1680, he was appointed during the papacy of Pope Clement IX as Bishop of Nusco.
On 13 October 1680, he was consecrated bishop by Carlo Pio di Savoia, Cardinal-Priest of San Crisogono, with Francesco Casati, Titular Archbishop of Trapezus, and Giuseppe Bologna, Archbishop Emeritus of Benevento, serving as co-consecrators. 
He served as Bishop of Nusco until his death on 7 June 1702.

References

External links and additional sources
 (for Chronology of Bishops) 
 (for Chronology of Bishops) 

17th-century Italian Roman Catholic bishops
18th-century Italian Roman Catholic bishops
Bishops appointed by Pope Clement IX
1638 births
1702 deaths